The 1939 County Championship was the 46th officially organised running of the County Championship. Yorkshire County Cricket Club won their 21st Championship.

The Championship was the last for six years due to World War II and during the 1939 Championship three matches were not played due to the outbreak of the war, they were abandoned on the third day.

Table
 12 pts for a win
 6 pts for a tie
 4 pts for a first innings lead in a match either drawn or lost
 8 pts for a win in a match under one day rules

 Includes 2 points for a tie on first innings in match lost

References

1939 in English cricket
County Championship seasons